Internatsionalnoye is a village in northern-central Kazakhstan. It is located in the Esil District in Akmola Region. Population:

Notable people
Eugene (Reshetnikov), bishop of the Russian Orthodox Church

References

Populated places in Akmola Region